Bream Beach is a suburb in the Shoalhaven local government area, consisting of holiday resort located near the Jervis Bay Territory in Australia.

Demographics

There are only 2 permanent inhabitants of Bream Beach, the owners of the park. Visitors are permitted to stay a maximum of 6 months per visit. The two small townships neighbouring Bream Beach (Erowal Bay and Wrights Beach) have only a few hundred residents each.

Geography

Bream Beach is located on St Georges Basin, almost exactly between Erowal Bay and Wrights Beach, the two closest townships.

Wildlife

Bream Beach is home to many different kinds of Australian native flora and fauna, including kangaroos, kookaburras, rosellas, lorikeets, wombats and many more.

References

External links
 Official site

City of Shoalhaven
Towns in New South Wales
Beaches of New South Wales